Leucettusa is a genus of sponges belonging to the family Leucaltidae. The species of this genus are mostly known from the Arctic and Antarctic, New Zealand and Southwest Australia.

Description 
Species have a simple tubular body with a large atrium, and choanocyte chambers which are either elongated, spherical or both.

Species 
The following species are recognised:

Leucettusa clathria
Leucettusa corticata 
Leucettusa dictyogaster 
Leucettusa haeckeliana 
Leucettusa imperfecta 
Leucettusa lancifera 
Leucettusa mariae 
Leucettusa nuda 
Leucettusa pyriformis 
Leucettusa sambucus 
Leucettusa simplicissima 
Leucettusa soyo 
Leucettusa tubulosa 
Leucettusa vera

References

Clathrinida
Sponge genera
Taxa named by Ernst Haeckel
Taxa described in 1872